Černí baroni is a Czech television series that aired in 2004. It is based on a series of books by Miloslav Švandrlík, including Černí baroni (1990), Říkali mu Terazky (1991), and Pět sekyr poručíka Hamáčka (1993). The show takes as its background one of the "technical auxiliary battalions" of the Czechoslovak People's Army during the socialist era in Czechoslovakia.

Cast and characters
 Andrej Hryc as Major Haluška
 Radek Holub as Private Kefalín
 Vítězslav Jandák as Captain Ořech
 Tomáš Töpfer as Captain Reich
 Karel Heřmánek as Captain Honec
 Oldřich Kaiser as Lieutenant Troník
 Bolek Polívka as Lieutenant Hamáček
 Petr Rychlý as Lieutenant Pecháček
 Petr Nárožný as General Mandel
 Pavel Liška as Private Ciml
 Martin Myšička as Private Šternberk

References

External links
 
 Černí baroni on Česká Televize

2004 Czech television series debuts
2004 television series endings
Czech comedy television series
Czech-language television shows
Television shows set in the Czech Republic
Television shows filmed in the Czech Republic
Czech Television original programming